Dame Catherine Winifred Harcourt  (née Fulton; born 16 June 1927), known professionally as Kate Harcourt, is a New Zealand actress. Over her long career she has worked in comedy as well as drama in theatre, film, TV and radio.

Personal life
Harcourt was born and grew up on a sheep station in the rural area of Amberley, New Zealand. Her mother was Australian, Winifred Harriet (Austin) and her father was Gordon Fulton. From age nine onward she attended boarding school, first at Amberley House and then at Woodford House (Hawke's Bay).

Music was important to Harcourt in her early years as it was to her mother too. She went to Christchurch to train as a kindergarten teacher partly so she could continue with her singing and piano. She also attended the Joan Cross Opera School in London.

Harcourt is the mother of actress Miranda Harcourt and former Fair Go television presenter Gordon Harcourt, and grandmother of actress Thomasin McKenzie. She played a part in the movie adaptation of The Changeover. Harcourt met her husband Peter Harcourt (1923–1995) at Wellington Repertory Theatre. He was from the family that founded Harcourts International real estate. Peter Harcourt died on 6 March 1995 of cancer, two years after being appointed a Companion of the Queen's Service Order in the 1993 New Year Honours for service to the community as an actor, broadcaster and presenter for 54 years since 1941. The Ngā Whakarākei O Whātaitai / Wellington Theatre Awards annually has an award called The Peter Harcourt Outstanding New Playwright.

Career 
Harcourt returned to New Zealand from London and took up a teaching position at Woodfood House in Havelock North. After that she moved to Wellington initially teaching at Marsden College, before working at the department store Kirkaldie and Stains organising and MC'ing weekly fashion shows for seven years.

Her entry into national entertainment came as a regular voice in the morning Listen with Mother which was a radio show for pre-schoolers on Radio New Zealand. She was later host of the children's TV show Junior Magazine.

Harcourt has acted in numerous stage and screen works. Stage work includes comedy with Hens' Teeth, and acting in a version of Hedda Gabler. She had a long association with theatre company Downstage starting out putting up posters for them. She lists acting in New Zealand playwright Renée's Wednesday to Come as one of her career favourites. Harcourt played Mary in the world premiere at Downstage Theatre in 1984.

In 1998 Harcourt performed on stage alongside her daughter Miranda Harcourt in the biographical Flowers from my Mother's Garden at the New Zealand Festival of the Arts. Written by Harcourt's daughter and son-in-law Stuart McKenzie, it was partly based on letters between mother and daughter. A review stated that the play shared "the experiences of a mother, daughter and extended family with an ingenious simplicity that belies the depth of insight. It's a prime example of how universal the particular can be."

Honours
In the 1996 Queen's Birthday Honours, Harcourt was appointed as a Dame Companion of the New Zealand Order of Merit, for services to the theatre.

Theatre and screen work

Film

Television

Short film

Web series

Theatre

References

External links

The Wellingtonian interview: Dame Kate Harcourt

1927 births
Living people
New Zealand film actresses
New Zealand stage actresses
New Zealand television actresses
People from Amberley, New Zealand
Actresses from Wellington City
Dames Companion of the New Zealand Order of Merit
Kate
Actresses awarded damehoods
20th-century New Zealand actresses
21st-century New Zealand actresses
New Zealand justices of the peace